SS Grant Wood was a Liberty ship built in the United States during World War II. She was named after Grant Wood, an American painter best known for his paintings depicting the rural American Midwest, particularly American Gothic.

Construction
Grant Wood was laid down on 6 August 1943, under a Maritime Commission (MARCOM) contract, MC hull 1208, by the St. Johns River Shipbuilding Company, Jacksonville, Florida; she was sponsored by Mrs. Joseph W. Shands, of Jacksonville, and was launched on 14 October 1943.

History
She was allocated to American Export Lines, on 26 October 1943. On 15 June 1946, she was laid up in the James River Reserve Fleet, Lee Hall, Virginia. She was sold for commercial use, 4 March 1947, to the government of Italy, for $544,506. She was removed from the fleet on 12 March 1947. Grant Wood was renamed Prsolina and reflagged in Italy.

References

Bibliography

 
 
 
 

 

Liberty ships
Ships built in Jacksonville, Florida
1943 ships
James River Reserve Fleet
Liberty ships transferred to Italy